Anoctamin 6 is a protein that in humans is encoded by the ANO6 gene.

Function

This gene encodes a multi-pass transmembrane protein that belongs to the anoctamin family. This protein is an essential component for the calcium-dependent exposure of phosphatidylserine on the cell surface. The scrambling of phospholipid occurs in various biological systems, such as when blood platelets are activated, they expose phosphatidylserine to trigger the clotting system. Mutations in this gene are associated with Scott syndrome. Alternatively spliced transcript variants encoding different isoforms have been found for this gene.

Research 

The protein may play a role in syncytia formation during COVID-19 infection.

See also 
 Phospholipid scramblase

References

Further reading

External links